Aurangabad High Madrasha is a higher secondary school in Aurangabad, Murshidabad, West Bengal. It is affiliated to West Bengal Board of Madrasah Education. The class of xi and xii is affiliated to West Bengal Council of Higher Secondary Education.

Alumni

Stream
The school is a higher secondary school. It has arts and science stream in the post matric classes. The students can take admission in arts or science by applying through the offline application.

Language

Arabic

Bengali

English

Arts

History

Geography

Political Science

Education

Philosophy

Home Management

Science

Commerce

Establishment

History

Education in West Bengal
Madrasas in West Bengal
Schools in West Bengal